Edward Kangwa (born 21 June 1977) is a retired Zambian professional footballer who played for Zanaco FC, Qingdao Jonoon FC, Olympiakos Nicosia and Partizani Tirana as well as the Zambia national team.

References 

Living people
Zambian expatriate footballers
Zambian footballers
FK Partizani Tirana players
Olympiakos Nicosia players
Cypriot First Division players
Expatriate footballers in Albania
Expatriate footballers in Cyprus
Zambian expatriate sportspeople in Albania
1977 births
Association football forwards